née Suzuki is a Japanese sport wrestler who competes in the women's freestyle category. She claimed silver medal in the women's 76 kg event during the 2019 World Wrestling Championships and also qualified to represent Japan at the 2020 Summer Olympics which will be held in Japan.

She was part of the Japan team which emerged as winners of the Wrestling World Cup in 2018.

References

External links
 

1987 births
Living people
Japanese female sport wrestlers
World Wrestling Championships medalists
Wrestlers at the 2018 Asian Games
Asian Games silver medalists for Japan
Asian Games medalists in wrestling
Medalists at the 2018 Asian Games
Sportspeople from Kyoto Prefecture
Ritsumeikan University alumni
Asian Wrestling Championships medalists
Wrestlers at the 2020 Summer Olympics
Olympic wrestlers of Japan
21st-century Japanese women